Pacifica High School (PHS) is a public high school in Oxnard, California. The school is part of the Oxnard Union High School District and serves students in northeast and downtown Oxnard.

History
In 1996, Oxnard Union High School District voters approved a $57 million school bond measure to finance construction of a new high school and improvements to existing campuses. Initially the Board of Trustees chose to name the campus Pacifico High School, shortened from Mar Pacifico (pacífico is Spanish for "peaceful"). Concerns soon arose that the new school shared its name with a brand of Mexican beer, so in 1999 the school board renamed the campus to Pacifica High School. The  campus was designed to accommodate up to 2,250 students, but by the 2018–19 school year the student population exceeded 3,000. Their current principal is Chris Ramirez.

Demographics
The demographic breakdown of the 3,153 students enrolled for 2017–18 was:
Male — 51%
Female — 49%
Asian — 4%
Black — 1%
Hispanic — 96%
Native Hawaiian/Pacific Islander — 0.2%
White — 1%
Multiracial — 0.5%
75.7% of the students were eligible for free or reduced-cost lunch. During the  school year, Pacifica was a Title I institution.

Academics
Pacifica High School's Culinary Arts Academy prepares students for careers in the food and beverage industry and further education in culinary arts. Students enter national culinary and hospitality competitions including FCCLA. Graduating seniors in the program conclude their studies at PHS by creating a four-course menu for their graduation dinner.

Athletics
Pacifica High School athletic teams are nicknamed the Tritons. The school is a member of the CIF Southern Section and competes in the Pacific View League.

The Pacifica football team won its first California state football championship in 2019, defeating McClymonds High School of Oakland 34–6 in the CIF-State Division 2-A bowl game. It is the first-ever state championship for a public school football program in Ventura County (private schools St. Bonaventure and Grace Brethren previously won state titles). En route to the state bowl, the Tritons also captured a CIF-SS championship.

Dance

Notable alumni
Victor Ortiz, boxer
Yadira Toraya, soccer player; midfielder for the Club Tijuana women's team

References

External links

 

Educational institutions established in 2001
High schools in Oxnard, California
Public high schools in California
Buildings and structures in Oxnard, California
2001 establishments in California